Speciociliatine is a major alkaloid of the plant Mitragyna speciosa, commonly known as kratom. It is a stereoisomer of Mitragynine and constitutes 0.00156 - 2.9% of the dried leaf material.

Pharmacology

Pharmacodynamics 
Speciociliatine has found to be a ligand of the mu and kappa opioid receptors, however findings are varied as to whether it functions as an agonist or a competitive antagonist at those sites.

Pharmacokinetics 

A preliminary pharmacokinetic analysis in male Sprague Dawley rats determined the elimination half-life of Speciociliatine to be 2.6 - 5 hours and the absolute bioavailability to be 20.7% (at an oral dose of 20 mg/kg).

References 

Indoloquinolizines
Tryptamine alkaloids
Methyl esters
Methoxy compounds